Harrisonburg may refer to a place in the United States:

 Harrisonburg, Louisiana
 Harrisonburg, Virginia